Saturday Night Live is an American sketch comedy series created and produced by Lorne Michaels for most of the show's run. The show has aired on NBC since 1975.

Saturday Night Live was not an immediate hit, but the show soon developed its own identity with help from the "Not Ready For Prime Time Players". After an unstable first season, more and more sketch comedy got on the air, and SNL became something of a New York institution. The first four seasons of the show were a hit both commercially and critically, catapulting the original cast into stardom.

For the 1979–80 season, cast members Dan Aykroyd and John Belushi left the show. This season is considered underwhelming by most standards. After this season, Michaels attempted to take a break and appoint featured player/writer Al Franken his successor, only to be replaced behind his back with associate producer Jean Doumanian for the 1980–81 season.

Background

Conception and development
In 1974, NBC Tonight Show host Johnny Carson requested that weekend "Best of Carson" reruns of his show (known as The Weekend Tonight Show Starring Johnny Carson) come to an end. This way, Carson could take two weeknights off and feed affiliates the specials on those nights. As Carson's show was extremely popular, NBC heard his request as an ultimatum, fearing he might use the issue to move to another network. To fill the gap, NBC brought in Dick Ebersol to develop a late-night variety show for airing on Saturday nights. Ebersol's first order of business was to hire a young Canadian producer named Lorne Michaels as the showrunner.

As New York City television production was in decline in the mid-1970s, NBC decided to base the new show at their studios in 30 Rockefeller Center. Michaels was given Studio 8H, a converted radio studio that was most famous for having hosted Arturo Toscanini and his orchestra in the 1950s. The studio had fallen into disuse, and was largely being used for election coverage by the mid-1970s.

Original team
The first cast members hired were Second City alumni Dan Aykroyd, John Belushi, Gilda Radner, National Lampoon "Lemmings" alumnus Chevy Chase (whose trademark became his usual falls and opening spiel that cued the show's opening), Jane Curtin, Laraine Newman, Garrett Morris and George Coe. The original head writer was Michael O'Donoghue, a writer at National Lampoon. The original theme music was written by future Academy Award-winning composer Howard Shore, who, along with his band (occasionally billed as the "All Nurse Band" or "Band of Angels"), was the original bandleader on the show. Paul Shaffer, who would go on to lead David Letterman's band on Late Night and then The Late Show, also served as bandleader in the early years.

Much of the talent pool involved in the inaugural season was recruited from The National Lampoon Radio Hour, a nationally syndicated comedy series that often satirised current events. O'Donoghue had worked alongside several cast members while directing the show. Actors and writers from Radio Hour received much more exposure and recognition on Saturday Night Live.

Debut (1975–1976)

The 1975–76 season began on October 11, 1975, with host George Carlin. The show was originally called NBC's Saturday Night, and would not be called Saturday Night Live until near the end of the 1976–77 season. The show was also intended to have just six episodes, and to be hosted by a permanent guest host instead of a rotating celebrity host (Albert Brooks was apparently picked as a permanent host). The show was originally much more of a typical variety show than it would later become, with the first episode featuring two musical guests (Janis Ian and Billy Preston) and the second almost entirely featuring music by Paul Simon. Sketch comedy would begin to dominate the show over the course of the season.

George Coe and Michael O'Donoghue would appear regularly throughout the season, even though they were only credited for the first few shows of the season. O'Donoghue would also appear regularly until the end of the 1978–79 season, although he was never again credited as a cast member.

Formula for success
Michaels fought network executives to accept his vision for the show, which was far removed from then-standard variety show conventions. One executive, visiting a dress rehearsal, noticed that the band was dressed in blue jeans and asked when their tuxedos would arrive. Before the show's premiere, Michaels remarked that he knew what the "ingredients would be, but not the proportions" and that the show would have to "find itself" on air. Indeed, the cast (known as the "Not Ready for Prime Time Players") would not be heavily featured in the show until the third episode, quickly becoming the focus of the show.

The 1975–76 season (and early episodes of the 1976–77 season) featured a recurring Muppets segment called The Land of Gorch. This segment was poorly received by the audience and was dropped. Films by Albert Brooks were also sometimes shown in these early episodes, although these were also dropped due to negative viewer reception.

It was also one of the only shows that consistently produced topical political satire. In 1976, Ron Nessen, press secretary for President Gerald Ford, hosted the show. Ford himself appeared in a pre-taped opening sequence. The show had been very critical of Ford (with Chase's bumbling impression becoming very popular with audiences) and promised to give him a break that night. On October 30, 1976, "Weekend Update" (a topical news sketch performed in every episode) played the 1974 broadcast of Ford pardoning President Richard Nixon. Many backstage felt that this decision was instrumental in helping Jimmy Carter win the 1976 election, especially among younger voters. Chase's departure for the show early in the 1976–77 season coincided with the 1976 presidential election, in which Democratic candidate Jimmy Carter was elected the 39th President of the United States of America. Cast member Dan Aykroyd was selected to portray Carter in subsequent seasons. His impression emphasized Carter's southern roots and the country twang in his voice. An episode hosted by Ralph Nader in January 1977 depicts Carter as a Confederate general, using his status as president-elect to take over the nation. Political parody was relatively new to American mainstream television in 1975; comedy shows in the past had rarely dared to push the envelope. By satirizing the head of the nation, Saturday Night Live redefined the parameters of acceptable television content and became "the first television show to speak the nation of the time", according to NBC executive Dick Ebersol.

Chevy Chase
Perhaps due to his recurring news parody sketch "Weekend Update", Chevy Chase was the first breakout star of Saturday Night Live, appearing on magazine covers, doing interviews, and receiving two Emmy awards in 1976 (one for performing and one for writing). As well as "Weekend Update", Chase would open each show with a pratfall before screaming the now-famous "Live from New York, it's Saturday Night!" On September 18, 1976, during the Ford-Carter debate sketch Debate '76, Chase tumbled off his podium. Because it lacked padding, he injured his groin. Dan Aykroyd, playing Jimmy Carter at the time, tried to help him, also falling. During the next two episodes, Chase appeared by phone with a picture of him calling from the hospital. A caption stated "VOICE OF CHEVY CHASE". He returned on October 16, 1976, via wheelchair.

Michaels later stated that he knew that Saturday Night Live could go in one of two directions: "It would either stay what it was... or it would morph into The Chevy Chase Show". Chase received offers to star in films. NBC offered him a prime-time series, but because he had signed a one-year contract, Chase would be free to leave television for a film career.

Though Chase had never been friendly with most of the cast (a rivalry with John Belushi went all the way back to their work on The National Lampoon Radio Hour, and by the time he left, he couldn't even get along with Lorne Michaels), Chase returned to host the show several times over the next two decades. Relations were often strained; the cast (whatever their own personal conflicts) would usually unite in opposition or disgust towards him, even hiding so that they would not have to share an elevator with him.

During Chase's 1978 hosting stint, Chase got into a brawl with Bill Murray mere moments before broadcast. In 1985, he horrified many of the cast by suggesting a sketch where openly gay performer Terry Sweeney develops AIDS and then show the audience how much weight he loses each week. In 1997, after being just generally difficult to work with, Chase was banned from ever hosting again. Despite this, Chase would occasionally make cameos following his ban from the show.

Cast

The Not Ready for Prime Time Players
Dan Aykroyd
John Belushi
Chevy Chase
George Coe (final episode: May 29, 1976)
Jane Curtin
Garrett Morris
Laraine Newman
Michael O'Donoghue
Gilda Radner

bold denotes Weekend Update anchor

Finding footing (1976–1977)

By the 1976–77 season, Saturday Night Live had grown into something of a television phenomenon. Like Rowan & Martin's Laugh-In several years earlier, it was, in many ways, a show that appealed to a younger audience, which made it appealing to advertisers. Recurring characters and catchphrases from the show soon entered the popular vernacular.

In March 1977, the show was renamed from NBC's Saturday Night to Saturday Night Live.

Bill Murray
Bill Murray's first appearance was on January 15, 1977, shortly after Chase left to pursue a movie career. Murray had a shaky start, forgetting his lines and seeming awkward. Many fans of Chase saw Murray as a replacement for him and had been sending hate mail. By the end of the second season, he began to develop a following with a sleazy know-it-all persona. Many of his characterizations, such as Nick the Lounge Singer and Todd DiLamuca (originally Todd DiLabounta before the real DiLabounta threatened to sue), became popular with audiences.

Cast

The Not Ready for Prime Time Players
Dan Aykroyd
John Belushi
Chevy Chase (final episode: October 30, 1976)
Jane Curtin
Garrett Morris
Bill Murray (first episode: January 15, 1977)
Laraine Newman
Gilda Radner

bold denotes Weekend Update anchor

Wide success (1977–1978)

The 1977–78 season was the final season of Saturday Night Live in which the cast was referred to as the Not Ready for Prime Time Players. Two notable "featured players" were hired during this season: writer Al Franken and his comedic partner Tom Davis.

Cast

The Not Ready for Prime Time Players
Dan Aykroyd
John Belushi
Jane Curtin
Garrett Morris
Bill Murray
Laraine Newman
Gilda Radner
Featuring
Tom Davis
Al Franken
bold denotes Weekend Update anchor

Period of stability (1978–1979)

The 1978-79 season would be the last for popular cast members Dan Aykroyd and John Belushi, who would leave to work on their film The Blues Brothers (based on their Saturday Night Live characters). Belushi and Michael O'Donoghue (who also departed at the end of the season) both made cameos in the 100th episode of the show.

Weekend, which aired once-a-month in the SNL time slot (and had been airing since 1974), was moved to prime time in the fall of 1978. In addition to new SNL episodes and reruns, the Saturday late night slot in 1978-1979 also included Above Average Productions specials like Things We Did Last Summer (featuring the SNL cast) and Diary of a Young Comic (starring Richard Lewis). Both were directed by frequent SNL filmmaker Gary Weis, whose 80 Blocks from Tiffany's was also intended to air in the Saturday late night slot. Mr. Mike's Mondo Video, directed by SNL writer Michael O'Donoghue and featuring members of the show's cast, was another project that ultimately did not air on TV. The last of the specials was Bob & Ray, Jane, Laraine & Gilda. Produced by Jean Doumanian (who would eventually become SNL producer in 1980), it featured Bob and Ray, SNLs three female cast members and musical guests Willie Nelson and Leon Russell. Above Average Productions would later be succeeded by (and even later, revived by) Broadway Video.

Cast
Dan Aykroyd
John BelushiJane CurtinGarrett MorrisBill MurrayLaraine Newman
Gilda Radner
Featuring
Tom Davis
Al Franken

bold denotes Weekend Update anchor

Cast shake-up (1979–1980)

The 1979–80 season would see the hiring of many writers as featured players, usually temporarily. Harry Shearer was the only one promoted to repertory status. Paul Shaffer was a major part of the show's band and had a role in several sketches (mainly a Don Kirshner impression) before 1979. Tom Schiller was a longtime filmmaker for Saturday Night Live (off and on in 1976–94). Jim Downey had been a writer and bit player since the 1976–77 season and would continue to write for the show on and off for the next 25 years. Alan Zweibel had been a writer since the show's beginning. Brian Doyle-Murray (Bill Murray's older brother) returned to the cast two years later for a season.

Drugs were a major problem during the show's first five years. "The value system that was around there was, as long as people showed up on time, did their job, it was nobody's business what they did in their bedroom or in their lives. That value system turned out to be wrong", Michaels later said. Aykroyd said that "The cocaine was a problem. Not for me, it was never my favorite... but it was around a lot, and it was affecting the work, the performance, the quality of the scripts... wasting time, and that was bad".

Laraine Newman had developed serious eating disorders as well as a heroin addiction. She spent so much time in her dressing room playing Solitaire that for Christmas 1979, castmate Radner gave her a deck of playing cards with a picture of Laraine on the face of each card. Garrett Morris was feeling degraded from years of small roles and what he saw as racist sketches. At one point, the writers were going to have him do a fake ad for "Tarbrush" toothpaste, which would dull African-Americans' supposedly shiny teeth (the bit was pulled "mercifully" at the last minute). Morris also struggled with his status on the show, and began free-basing cocaine. During rehearsals for the Kirk Douglas-hosted show, Morris ran screaming onto the set, saying that someone had put an "invisible robot" on his shoulder who watched him everywhere he went. He pleaded with crew to get the robot off of him.

Radner, meanwhile, was resented by many because she and Michaels had spent much of the year working on a Broadway play/album, Gilda Live. She had recently broken off a relationship with Bill Murray, and they could barely speak to one another. Murray resented that the other male cast members had left him stranded and essentially forced him to play every male lead on the show. Exhausted, Gilda had few starring roles during the 1979–80 season.

The most energetic and diverse performer during this season was Jane Curtin, who was thrilled to see the "Bully Boys", as she called them (Aykroyd and Belushi), depart and who debuted a number of new characters and impressions while she had the chance (she became noted this season for her impersonation of Nancy Reagan). Featured players/writers Al Franken and Tom Davis also contributed more heavily during the season, giving themselves more prominent roles as Aykroyd and Belushi departed. Another surprise contributor was writer Don Novello, whose "Father Guido Sarducci" character was especially popular and appeared repeatedly during the 1979–80 season.

Michaels' departure
In May 1980, as the season was wrapping, Lorne Michaels decided he was ready for a break. Knowing that most of the cast and many of the writers would be departing, he attempted to persuade the network to put the show on hiatus for six months to recast; NBC refused this attempt to let the show survive in reruns for half a year. Michaels' contract was up for renewal, and he felt somewhat slighted by NBC in negotiations. Michaels had always held a tense relationship with then-NBC President Fred Silverman, and it was not helped by SNL's numerous on-air taunts about NBC's abysmal prime-time performance during Silverman's tenure. In fact, SNL was one of the few truly popular shows on the network during this period, but Michaels and his representatives felt renewing his contract was a secondary priority to NBC executives behind Johnny Carson's, which was also up for renewal.

Michaels subsequently took his name off the show and left at the end of the season, along with the rest of the original cast and the writing staff, most of whom followed suit due to loyalty towards Michaels. Among these was Franken, whom Michaels had originally hand-picked as his successor. Franken had, earlier in the season, written and delivered a monologue on the show called "A Limo For A Lame-O" that directly insulted Silverman, who had not been warned about the sketch and thereafter despised Franken. Harry Shearer, who had zero allegiance to Michaels, informed the incoming executive producer, Jean Doumanian, that he would stay as long as she let him completely overhaul the program. Doumanian refused, so Shearer also bid farewell (he would return briefly during the 1984–85 season).

The remaining cast appeared together for the last time on May 24, 1980, for the final episode of the season. The episode, hosted by longtime loyal host Buck Henry, gave a heartfelt goodbye from all the members of the cast, and Henry himself who, after hosting ten times in five years, never returned to the show (barring a brief appearance on the 1989 15th Anniversary Special). Almost every writer and cast member on the show, including Lorne Michaels, left the show after this episode. Brian Doyle-Murray was the only writer from this season to stay on for the 1980–81 season.

CastJane CurtinGarrett MorrisBill Murray'''
Laraine Newman
Gilda Radner
Harry Shearer (upgraded to repertory status: February 9, 1980)Featuring'' 
Peter Aykroyd
Tom Davis
Jim Downey
Brian Doyle-Murray (first episode: December 15, 1979)
Al Franken
Don Novello
Tom Schiller
Paul Shaffer
Alan Zweibel (first episode: October 20, 1979)

bold denotes Weekend Update anchor

References

1975
Saturday Night Live history 1975
Saturday Night Live 1975-1980
Saturday Night Live 1975-1980